Park Terrace may refer to
 Park Terrace, Adelaide
 Park Terrace, Cambridge